Kalix UHC, or Kalix ungdomshockeyclub, is a Swedish ice hockey club based in Kalix in northern Sweden.  The club was founded in 2001 by members of the community when the area's previous hockey club, Kalix HF, was threatened with bankruptcy.  The club's A-team competes in Division 1, the third tier of ice hockey in Sweden, .

Season-by-season

References

External links
Official website
Profile on Eliteprospects.com

Ice hockey teams in Sweden
Sport in Kalix
Ice hockey teams in Norrbotten County